1939 Országos Bajnokság I (men's water polo) was the 33rd water polo championship in Hungary. There were ten teams who played one-round match for the title.

Final list 

* M: Matches W: Win D: Drawn L: Lost G+: Goals earned G-: Goals got P: Point

2. Class 
1. Tatabányai SC, 2. NTE, 3. ETE, 4. Szegedi VSE.

Sources 
Gyarmati Dezső: Aranykor (Hérodotosz Könyvkiadó és Értékesítő Bt., Budapest, 2002.)
Magyar Sport Almanach 1937-1939

1939 in water polo
1939 in Hungarian sport
Seasons in Hungarian water polo competitions